Blanchland railway station served the village of Blanchland, Northumberland, England, from 1845 to 1965 on the Stanhope and Tyne Railway.

History 
The station opened as Parkhead on 1 July 1845 by the Stockton and Darlington Railway. It was situated on the north side of a road east of the B6278. It opened as a goods station but there is evidence of passenger usage. It closed to passengers in 1862 but remained open for goods. Its name was changed to Blanchland on 1 July 1923. It closed to goods on 2 August 1965.

References

External links 

Disused railway stations in Northumberland
Railway stations opened in 1845
Railway stations closed in 1862
1845 establishments in England
1965 disestablishments in England

Railway stations in Great Britain opened in 1845